Nadim al-Maghrebi is an Islamist militant organization formed in 2006 that seeks to remove Ceuta and Melilla from Spanish rule. It has issued a statement through the Internet asking Muslims to declare "war on Spanish infidel state and release the occupied cities of Ceuta and Melilla". This group is allegedly linked to Al Qaeda.

References

Further reading
 José María Irujo Ceuta y Melilla se convierten en objetivo de la guerra santa islámica El País (Spain). 5 Nov 2006.
Javier Jordán & Robert Wesley The Threat of Grassroots Jihadi Networks: A Case Study from Ceuta, Spain Terrorism Monitor.  15 Feb 2007.

Islamic organizations established in 2006
Paramilitary organisations based in Spain
Islamic terrorism in Spain
Terrorism in Morocco
Islamic terrorism in Morocco
National liberation movements
Groups affiliated with al-Qaeda
Territorial disputes of Spain